CATD may refer to:

Combined Arms and Tactics Directorate, a component of the United States Army Infantry School
CATD, a relation of the Relational Model/Tasmania
"Crying at the Discoteque", a 2000 single by Alcazar
Carnitine-acylcarnitine translocase deficiency